Syfy (in some countries named Sci Fi) is a family of pay television channels that broadcast programming owned or licensed by entertainment NBCUniversal around the world using the Syfy brand which is focused on science fiction, fantasy, horror, supernatural and paranormal programming. The first such channel was launched in the United States on September 24, 1992. It was originally named "Sci-Fi Channel". In 1995 it kicked off in the United Kingdom, followed by the Netherlands and Belgium in 1996.
The name Syfy was officially adopted on July 7, 2009, and most were renamed Syfy Universal by 2010. Exceptions to this renaming scheme included Syfy USA, Syfy Germany, Syfy France, Syfy Latin America, Syfy Spain, Syfy Portugal and future Syfy Channels in Cyprus, Nordic countries, South Africa, Turkey and now defunct and replaced SF Australia (formerly Sci Fi Channel Australia) and Syfy UK. The Sci Fi Channels in Poland, Serbia, Slovenia and future Sci Fi Channels in Austria, Baltic countries, Bulgaria, the Czech Republic, Greece, Hungary, Italy, Malta, Slovakia and now defunct Sci Fi Channel in Romania and Russia, became Sci Fi Universal due to syfy having a profane meaning in Polish. In 2017 the channel got rebranded but the  Universal suffix was already dropped.

The list of Syfy or Sci Fi channels around the world

See also
 CTV Sci-Fi Channel, a Canadian television channel that shows most of Sci-Fi Channel/Syfy's programming

References

NBCUniversal networks
Science fiction television channels
Syfy
Universal Networks International